Nudadiha (alternately spelled as Nodhadiha) is a village located in Kaptipada block of Mayurbhanj district, Orissa, India. , it had a population of 1161 persons spread over 239 households. The village has a near even male to female distribution ratio. The village is the main village for the Nudadiha gram panchayat which includes the adjacent villages of Sarbanaghaty, Nuagan, Kukurdima, Talia, Nandursahi, Potaldiha, and Narsinghbedha.

It has two primary schools, one middle school (English medium), and three high schools. One junior cum degree college & one Sanskrit college is also located in the village. These educational institutions fulfill the educational needs of the village as well as the nearby villages.

References

Villages in Mayurbhanj district